The United States was a founding member of the International Monetary Fund (IMF), having hosted the other countries at the IMF’s founding conference, the Bretton Woods Conference, in 1944. In addition, under the Bretton Woods system, other countries’ currencies were kept at a fixed exchange rate to the U.S. dollar, which in turn was pegged to the value of gold.

Later in the 20th century, the U.S. began to accumulate balance-of-payment debt and its gold reserve (once 60% of all gold) began to shrink. As a result, in 1971, the U.S. ended the fixed exchange rate between dollars and gold in the Nixon shock.

The US continues to be the largest financial contributor to the IMF. As such, it has the most voting power (at 17%) and can effectively veto any motion. It also has close relations with IMF leadership.

History

Initial plans 
The concept and initial plans for the IMF originated in the United States. Shortly after World War II, delegates from 44 countries convened in the Mount Washington Hotel in Bretton Woods, New Hampshire, U.S., for the Bretton Woods Conference in 1944. The objective of the conference was to design a system to rebuild Europe; after World War II, Europe had become economically unstable and required financial assistance. The result was that the U.S. became a founding member of the IMF. American influence was strong from the beginning; at its inception and during its early years, the IMF was founded in large part on core principles presented by American Chief International Economist of the U.S. Treasury Department Harry Dexter White.

The IMF was formally established through the Bretton Woods Agreement and System; this created the first international currency exchange system that would last until the 1970s. According to this system, the U.S. dollar would become the central global currency. One ounce of gold was to be worth 35 U.S. dollars and the U.S. promised to sell at this price. Meanwhile, all other countries would have to maintain their current exchange rate to the U.S. dollar.

20th century 
The Bretton Woods System was founded on the principle that the U.S. was a steady and reliable global economy; the U.S. had over 60% of the world's total gold in its reserve. However, starting in the 1950s, the U.S. began to accrue consistent balance-of-payment debt. From 1950 to 1957, U.S. BOP debt was estimated to be around 1.3 billion dollars annually. At the same time, the U.S. gold reserve started to leak: from 1950 to 1957 the U.S. lost an estimated 213 million dollars worth of gold annually. This debt continued to increase, reaching 3.7 billion dollars in BOP debt and 1.4 billion dollars of gold each year from 1958 to 1962. In addition to debt and a shrinking gold reserve, the U.S. dollar experienced accelerated inflation after 1965. Prior to 1965, inflation was at less than 2 percent per year. After 1965, this figure tripled to around 6 percent. Ultimately, the U.S. ended the fixed exchange rate between the U.S. dollar and an ounce of gold that was originally agreed upon in what is now known as the Nixon shock.

21st century 
Currently, the U.S. is the largest financial contributor with around 117 billion dollars committed in IMF quota and 44 billion dollars committed in supplemental funds. The U.S. also currently holds an IMF quota of 83 billion SDRs. As the largest financial contributor to the IMF, the U.S. receives the most voting power amongst all participating countries at around 17%. This gives the U.S. the ability to veto any major proposal as 85% of votes must concur in order for any motion to pass. In addition to formal influence, the U.S. also has close relations to the IMF management team including the managing director; the managing director alone holds the power to set the agendas for the IMF.

References 

Economy of the United States
International Monetary Fund relations